The Rafael Temple is a synagogue in Punta del Este, Uruguay. 

This is the oldest synagogue in Punta del Este.

See also
 List of synagogues in Uruguay

References

Synagogues in Maldonado Department
Rafael